Bromley and Watkins was an architectural practice based in Nottingham from 1912 to 1928.

History

Albert Nelson Bromley and Harry Garnham Watkins established the practice in Nottingham in 1912. Harry Garnham Watkins was the son of William Watkins, an architect from Lincoln. The partnership was dissolved in 1928 when Harry Garnham Watkins retired.

Works

Boots the Chemist Factory, Station Street, Nottingham 1912
Boots the Chemist, Northgate, Gloucester 1914
Boots the Chemist, 130 High Street, Southend-on-Sea 1915 
Boots the Chemist, 7 & 8 Pride Hill, Shrewsbury 1915
Griffin & Spalding department store, Long Row, Nottingham 1919-20 and 1927 (later Debenhams)
National Provincial Bank, 11 Smithy Row, Nottingham 1927-28
National Provincial Bank, Wolverhampton
Convalescent home for boys, Rosebery Avenue, Skegness 1928

References

Architecture firms based in Nottingham
Architects from Nottingham
1912 establishments in England